The 10,000 metres at the World Championships in Athletics has been contested by men since the inaugural edition in 1983 and by women since the subsequent edition in 1987. It is the second most prestigious title in the discipline after the 10,000 metres at the Olympics. The competition format is a straight final with typically between twenty and thirty participants. Before 1999, the event had two qualifying heats leading to a final.

The championship records for the event are 26:46.31 minutes for men, set by Kenenisa Bekele in 2009, and 30:04.18 minutes for women, set by Berhane Adere in 2003. The world record has never been broken or equalled at the competition by either men or women, reflecting the lack of pacemaking and athletes' more tactical approach to championship races.

Haile Gebrselassie is the most successful athlete of the event with four gold medals and also a silver and a bronze, spanning a period from 1993 to 2003. His Ethiopian compatriot Kenenisa Bekele matched his feat of four consecutive titles in 2009. Tirunesh Dibaba is the most successful woman, with three gold medals to her name (2005, 2007, 2013, plus a silver in 2017).

Ethiopia is by far the most successful nation in the discipline, with fifteen gold medals and 33 medals in total. Kenya is comfortably the next most successful with seven gold and 25 medals overall. Great Britain is the only other nation to have won multiple gold medals, with three in the men's and one in the women's division.

Four winners of the 10,000 m have completed a long-distance double by also winning the 5000 metres at the World Championships in Athletics: Tirunesh Dibaba was the first to do so in 2005, Kenenisa Bekele became the first man to do so in 2009, and Vivian Cheruiyot (2011) and Mo Farah (2013/2015) followed at the subsequent editions. Of these, only Mo Farah has achieved the feat twice, in 2013 and 2015 - either side of which he performed the same feat in consecutive Olympic Games.

One athlete, Sifan Hassan of the Netherlands, has completed a rare 10,000 metres - 1500 metres double, in 2019.

Age
At 15 years, 153 days, Sally Barsosio won the bronze medal in the women's 10,000 m at the 1993 World Championships in Athletics. This makes her the youngest World Championships medallist in any discipline.

All information from IAAF

Doping
Elvan Abeylegesse of Turkey became the first athlete to be disqualified from the World Championships 10,000 metres for doping. This ban came retrospectively as a 2015 retest of a frozen sample of urine from the 2007 World Championships in Athletics showed the presence of a banned substance. She was stripped of her silver medal.

No other competitors have been banned from the event for doping. Outside of the competition, the 2003 women's bronze medallist Sun Yingjie was banned for doping in 2005.

Medalists

Men

In the sixteen editions until 2017, the men's race at the World Championships has been dominated by three men; Ethiopians Haile Gebrselassie and Kenenisa Bekele, and Great Britain's Mo Farah - between them, they have won eleven of the sixteen editions held, won silver twice, and bronze once.

Multiple medalists

Medalists by country

Women

Although no Kenyan or Ethiopian won any of the first four editions of the race, they shared all eleven since, with Ethiopia's Tirunesh Dibaba and Kenya's Vivian Cheruiyot the dominant athletes, with three wins, and two win's respectively, until the West African dominance was interrupted by Dutchwoman Sifan Hassan. The next highest ranked nation, China, won all but one if its medals in the now discredited era of 'Ma's Army', the distance running program run by Ma Junren.

Multiple medalists

Medalists by country

Championship record progression

Men

Women

References

External links
Official IAAF website

 
World Championships in Athletics
Events at the World Athletics Championships